The tenth season of the reality sports competition series American Ninja Warrior premiered on May 30, 2018 on NBC. Hosts Matt Iseman and Akbar Gbaja-Biamila returned for their ninth and sixth seasons, respectively, alongside sideline reporter Kristine Leahy who returns for her fourth. Prior to the season premiere, NBC aired two special episodes. On May 17, 2018, a two-hour All-Stars special aired, while on May 24, 2018, the second annual Celebrity Ninja Warrior for Red Nose Day featured celebrities raising money for charity.

Changes this season included the introduction of the 18-foot (5.5 m) "Mega Wall". It was next to the original 14'6" (4.4 m) warped wall, and gave competitors the choice of which to climb. Competitors who chose the Mega Wall had only one attempt to reach the top, and if successful, would win $10,000. If unsuccessful, the competitor would only get one shot at the warped wall. Those who did not wish to attempt the Mega Wall had three chances to reach the top of the warped wall. The Mega Wall was only in play during the city qualifying. In addition, the age limit was lowered down from 21 in all previous seasons to 19 this season. The "Last Ninja Standing", the competitor who goes the farthest in the finals, if no one completes Stage 4, would now receive $100,000.

Season 7 champion Isaac Caldiero participated and finished the Indianapolis qualifiers, marking his return to competition in the series. He would later fall in the city finals, marking the end of his season as he fell at Block Run.

Competition schedule

Obstacles

City Qualifying & Finals
  Indicates obstacles created by fans for the "American Ninja Warrior Obstacle Design Challenge".

National Finals

City courses

Bold denotes the finishers who completed the Mega Wall and received a $10,000 bonus.
Italics denote the Top 5 women who also finished in the overall Top 30.

Los Angeles

Qualifying

A "Jurassic World Night"-themed course was present during the episode. It featured Jurassic World-like decorations and dinosaurs. This was to promote the upcoming action-thriller movie Jurassic World: Fallen Kingdom. Actors Chris Pratt and Bryce Dallas Howard both made special appearances. The course featured two new obstacles, the Jumper Cables and Doorknob Drop.

Bold denotes the finishers who completed the Mega Wall and received a $10,000 bonus.
Italics denote the Top 5 women who also finished in the overall Top 30.

Finals

The Los Angeles Finals were the first finals to air this season and introduced some new changes to the Finals competition. Unlike past seasons, two of the original 6 obstacles were replaced for the finals, in this case, the Archer Steps (a new obstacle) replaced the Floating Steps and the Flying Shelf Grab replaced the Sky Hooks. This course consisted of two new obstacles on the back half: the Baton Pass and the new finals closer, the Spider Trap.

Dallas

Qualifying

The Dallas Qualifying featured two new obstacles, the Catch & Release and the Tuning Forks. The Mega Wall was also introduced.

Bold denotes the finishers who completed the Mega Wall and received a $10,000 bonus.
Italics denote the Top 5 women who also finished in the overall Top 30.

Finals

The Dallas Finals replaced the first and fourth obstacles with the Archer Steps and the Broken Bridge, respectively. The back half of the ANW course featured the new themed obstacle called Fallout which is inspired by action stunts from the film, Mission: Impossible – Fallout.

Miami

Qualifying

In attendance were University of Miami cheerleaders and the university mascot Sebastian the Ibis, along with 3-time NFL All-Pro Jevon Kearse, and  "Ninjatron", a 10-foot homemade ninja robot costume made by competitor Jesse Johnson. The Miami Qualifying featured two new obstacles, the Ring Turn and Slippery Summit.

Bold denotes the finishers who completed the Mega Wall and received a $10,000 bonus.
Italics denote the Top 5 women who also finished in the overall Top 30.

Finals

In attendance yet again were University of Miami cheerleaders and the university mascot Sebastian the Ibis. The Miami Finals replaced the Floating Steps with the Archer Steps, the Fly Wheels with Cannonball Drop, as well as added a new obstacle to the back half, the Crazy Clocks.

Italics denote the Top 2 women who also finished in the overall Top 15.

Indianapolis

Qualifying

The Indianapolis Qualifying marked the return of the only winner of American Ninja Warrior; bus boy and rock climber, Isaac Caldiero who achieved "total victory" three seasons ago. U.S. Women's Hockey Olympic Gold medalist Kendall Coyne and IndyCar racer and 2008 Indianapolis 500 champ Scott Dixon ran the course which was held at the historic Monument Circle. In attendance was the Indianapolis Colts cheerleaders and their mascot "Blue", as well as the University of Indiana cheerleaders. The Indianapolis Qualifying featured two new obstacles, the Wheel Flip and Spin Hopper. No finishers were able to conquer the Mega Wall.

Italics denote the Top 5 women who also finished in the overall Top 30.

Finals

The Indianapolis Finals replaced the Floating Steps with the Archer Steps. Cannonball Drop was replaced with the Fly Wheels, and a new obstacle, Cane Lane, was added to the back half.
Italics denote the Top 2 women who also finished in the overall Top 15.

Philadelphia

Qualifying

The Philadelphia Qualifying featured two new obstacles, the Spinning Bowties and Lightning Bolts. In attendance was the Philadelphia Eagles cheerleaders and their mascot "Swoop", as well as former Eagles wide receiver-turned ANW fan, Jason Avant, who ran the course. His former teammate Quintin Mikell and current Eagles cornerback Jalen Mills showed their support on the sidelines. This was the first qualifier that 3 women finished the course on the same night – Michelle Warnky, Allyssa Beird and rookie Casey Rothschild, who, at 20 years old, was the youngest female competitor (and the second female rookie ever) to hit the buzzer after Meagan Martin.

Bold denotes the finishers who completed the Mega Wall and received a $10,000 bonus.
Italics denote the Top 5 women who also finished in the overall Top 30.

Finals

In attendance again were the Philadelphia Eagles cheerleaders and mascot Swoop, along with the cheerleaders from Villanova University were cheering on the athletes. The Philadelphia Finals featured one new obstacle, Captain's Wheel.

Italics denote the Top 2 women who also finished in the overall Top 15.

Minneapolis

Qualifying

The Minneapolis Qualifying featured two new obstacles, the Double Twister and Diamond Dash. The competition was held outside U.S. Bank Stadium where the Minnesota Vikings play. The Minnesota Vikings Cheerleaders and the team's mascot Viktor the Viking and drumline the "Skol Line", along with the University of Minnesota cheerleaders and the school's mascot, Goldy Gopher, and also the Mayor of Minneapolis, Jacob Frey came to support the ninjas. No competitors were able to complete the Mega Wall.

Italics denote the Top 5 women who also finished in the overall Top 30.

Finals

The Minneapolis Finals replaced the Floating Steps with the Archer Steps and replaced the Ring Jump with the Sky Hooks. One new obstacle was added to the back half, the Hinge.

City Qualifying Leaderboard

Bold denotes the finishers who completed the Mega Wall and received a $10,000 bonus.
Italics denote the Top 5 women who also finished in the overall Top 30.

City Finals Leaderboard

Italics denote the Top 2 women who also finished in the overall Top 15.

National Finals

The National Finals were taped in June 2018 on the vacant lot across from the Luxor Hotel on the Las Vegas Strip that has been home to the Finals since the show stopped sending the finalists to Japan. The lot is close to the Las Vegas Village location of the Route 91 Harvest Festival shootings, which led the producers to consider finding another venue before deciding to return. The taping took place on the first two nights of a weeklong session that also included tapings for the "USA vs. The World", "All-Stars Team Challenge", and "All-Stars Skills Challenge" special events.

This season, 97 competitors made it to Vegas. In attendance were the Vegas Golden Knights cheerleaders and mascot Chance cheering on the competitors.

Note: Even though she earned a place in the Las Vegas finals, 5-time ANW finalist Jessie Graff could not compete because of her shooting schedule while filming Wonder Woman 1984 (Wonder Woman sequel) as a stuntwoman. Jessie is seen on the Stage 1 finals Day 2 episode in Canary Islands, Spain telling the viewers about it and wishing her fellow competitors "good luck".

Stage 1
30 Competitors made it through this grueling Stage 1 course. The Double Dipper knocked out 26 competitors on Stage 1, the most of any obstacle on Stage 1, including David Campbell, Brett Sims, Travis Rosen, Flip Rodriguez, Jeremiah Morgan, Chris DiGangi, Karsten Williams, Neil Craver, Abel Gonzalez, Tyler Yamuachi, Rigel Henry, Michael Johnson, Rachael Goldstein, Abby Clark, and the man who made it the farthest the previous season, Joe Moravsky.
The highlight of Stage 1 was Jamie Rahn who became the first competitor in ANW to finish the course barefoot when he ran the course (for the most part) without shoes when his right sneaker came off during the Propeller Bar. He completed the course in 2:17.93.

Stage 1 featured four new obstacles, Archer Alley, Jeep Run, the Razor Beams, and Twist & Fly.

Stage 2 

Stage 2 featured three new obstacles, Epic Catch and Release, Deja Vu, and the first underwater obstacle, the Water Walls.

Leaderboard

Stage 3 

Stage 3 featured one new obstacle, En Garde.

For the first time on American Ninja Warrior, a cash prize is guaranteed to the player who makes it furthest in the competition of $100,000, in the event that no one completes Stage 4. Drew Drechsel became season 10's Last Ninja Standing on the tie-breaker over Sean Bryan, as Sean failed at the Ultimate Cliffhanger. However, because of an announcement in July 2020 over the ongoing United States v. Drechsel litigation that affects Drechsel's prize money being held in escrow over eligibility requirements (his alleged crimes took place before this season was taped), should he be convicted, Bryan would claim the prize by forfeit.

Ratings

References

American Ninja Warrior
2018 American television seasons